Siddhu +2 is a 2010 Indian Tamil-language romance film written and directed by K. Bhagyaraj, starring his son Shanthnoo Bhagyaraj and newcomer Chandini Tamilarasan in lead roles. The film released on 10 December 2010 and performed averagely at the box office.

Plot 
Siddharth, the son of a school principal, runs away from his home due to failing in his higher secondary exams. He meets Pavithra, who has likewise failed, and the two travel to Chennai, with Siddu planning to commit suicide. They eventually fall in love and decide to start a new life. After a host of misadventures, including one where Siddu crosses paths with a brutal policeman, they discover that Pavithra has passed her exams. When she realizes that Siddu had initially tried to hide this fact from her, she runs back to her house and joins a medical course. Siddu attempts to get her back, staying in a barbershop owned by a local. There, he has to contend with Pavithra's murderous father, her eccentric uncle who is determined to marry her and a Gujarati woman who falls in love with him. These elements, along with the policeman attempting to kill him in an encounter, come together in the final act to threaten Siddu and his love life. How Siddu triumphs forms the rest of story.

Cast 

 Shanthnoo Bhagyaraj as Siddharth (Siddhu)
 Chandini Tamilarasan as Pavithra
 Kausha Rach as Kausha
 Ganja Karuppu as Barbershop Owner
 Seetha as Siddhu's mother
 Seema
 Pragathi
 Rajesh as Siddhu's father
 Anu Mohan
 Avinash as Pavithra's father
 Anirudh as Police officer
 Manobala as Police officer
 Nellai Siva as Police officer
 Alex
 Muthukaalai as Beggar / Godman
 Scissor Manohar
 K. Bhagyaraj (Cameo appearance)
 Senthil (Cameo appearance)
 Thalaivasal Vijay (Cameo appearance)

Production 
The film was initially titled Puthiya Vaarpugal, but later changed to avoid the misconception that it was a remake of the 1979 film of the same name.

Soundtrack 
Music is composed by Dharan, teaming up with K. Bhagyaraj for the second time following a successful collaboration in Parijatham (2006). The soundtrack album, which released on 31 October 2010, features six songs, with two of them being composed by Dharan and Babu Shankar, and another two being a remix from Bhagyaraj's Idhu Namma Aalu (1988) and "En Sogakathaiyai" from Thooral Ninnu Pochu. Notably, music composer Yuvan Shankar Raja and film director Venkat Prabhu's had lent their voices for each a song. "Poove Poove" in particular became popular and a chartbuster. Lyrics were penned by Na. Muthukumar, Babu Shankar and Amudhamani.

Release 
The film remained unreleased for one year, it was initially slated to release in January 2011 but eventually got preponed and released in December 2010. The film was made simultaneously in Telugu as Love in Hyderabad, starring Kannada actress Aindrita Ray as the female lead and was directed by Mahesh Chandra. However the film did not face a theatrical release, owing to the failure of the original version.

Critical reception 
Behindwoods wrote:"‘Siddu +2, 1st attempt’ has a neat story [sic] but the heart and soul of this concept remains unexplored throughout the show". Sify wrote "the film is painfully predictable, and offers nothing original in its writing or treatment. It just doesn't work because it's hard to empathize with any of the characters and the actors fail to rise above the flawed script".

References

External links 
 

2010 films
2010s Tamil-language films
Films directed by K. Bhagyaraj
Indian multilingual films
Films scored by Dharan Kumar